DRAGONSat (Dual RF Astrodynamic GPS Orbital Navigator Satellite) is a pair of nanosatellites that will be demonstrating autonomous rendezvous and docking (ARD) in low Earth orbit (LEO) for NASA. It will be gathering flight data with a global positioning system (GPS) receiver strictly designed for space applications to gather flight data in the space environment. ARD is the capability of two independent spacecraft to rendezvous in orbit and dock without crew intervention. One DRAGONSat was built by the University of Texas and the other one was built by Texas A and M University, the Space Shuttle Payload Launcher (SSPL), These satellite projects will rendezvous and dock with each other in space without the benefit of human intervention.

DRAGONSat is planned to be an eight-year program with a launch of the satellites approximately every two years. The first three missions will test individual components and subsystems while the final mission will culminate with the successful docking of two satellites. Each mission builds upon the previous mission culminating in a fully autonomous rendezvous and docking mission. Both universities are required to use GPS receivers designed by NASA in order to determine its functionality. One of the objectives is to demonstrate precision real-time navigation capability as well as precision relative navigation between the two satellites.

Operations 

DRAGONSat is a pair of two 5 inches x 5 inches x 5 inches satellites which are launched from the Shuttle orbiter payload bay. Both satellites are built of aluminum with a mass of approximately 7.5 kg. Each picosatellite is covered with photo-voltaic cells and will enable a longer active life in orbit. Each satellite also has a dipole antenna and two antennas for the GPS receiver. The satellites are ejected from the SSPL which is located on the payload bay sidewall.

Protocols 

Both DRAGONSat are launched together in the Space Shuttle Payload Launcher (SSPL) from the side walls of the orbiter payload bay. They are ejected as a pair and once they are at a safe distance from the Space Shuttle, they will separate and begin the experiment. Data collection will be downlinked to ground stations for as long as the satellites are able to transmit.

Specifications 
''Section source'
DRAGONSat-1 "BEVO-1"
 Country: USA
 Application: Spacecraft docking technology
 Operator: University of Texas at Austin
 Contractors: University of Texas at Austin
 Equipment: DRAGON GPS Receiver
 Configuration: 5" cube
 Propulsion: none
 Lifetime: 3.5 kg
 Mass: 5 kg

DRAGONSat-2 "AggieSat-2"
 Country: USA
 Application: Spacecraft docking technology
 Operator: Texas A&M University
 Contractors: Texas A&M University
 Equipment: DRAGON GPS Receiver
 Configuration: 5" cube
 Propulsion: None
 Lifetime: 3.5 kg
 Mass: 3.5 kg

Launches 
 STS-127 Shuttle
On July 30, 2009 STS-127 Flight Day 16 the first pair of DRAGONSats were inserted into orbit.  Space Shuttle Endeavour placed them in orbit at 8:35 am EDT. for their  multiyear mission to study automatic dockings in space. Deployment occurred over central South America at an altitude of 218 miles.

See also 
 CubeSat
 PicoSAT

References

External links
 Gunters Space Page: AggieSat 2 (DRAGONSat 2)

NASA satellites
Spacecraft launched in 2009
Spacecraft which reentered in 2010
Nanosatellites
Secondary payloads